GTL Limited,  (previously Global Telesystems Limited) a Global Group Enterprise, is a Network Services company based in Navi Mumbai. It is India's largest network services provider to the world.

GTL Limited has services to address the Network Life Cycle requirements of Telecom Operators, Technology providers, Original Equipment Manufacturers(OEM’s) and Tower Companies across India and also across Asia Pacific, Europe and Middle East through its subsidiaries.

History
In 2001, GTL set up a 1,000 seat Call centre in Navi Mumbai. In 2007, GTL Ltd monetized its Enterprise Networks and Managed Services business to Orange Business Services, an arm of France Telecom. Their deal with Reliance Communications fell through in 2010. GTL Ltd provides network services across Asia Pacific, Europe and the Middle East.

Shareholding
, the number of equity shares of GTL Ltd were approx. 157.29 million. The Promoter and the Promoter group including Global Holding Corporation Private Limited, collectively hold approx. 30.25% of the total equity shares and banks (including the Lender Banks under Corporate Debt Restructuring mechanism) hold about 37. 21% and the balance 32.54% shares are held by public shareholders, including Foreign Bodies, Registered Foreign Portfolio Investors, Financial Institutions and corporate bodies. Syndicate Bank is the largest non-promoter investor in the Company with 13.99% shareholding.

Listing
The Company's equity shares are listed on the NSE Limited and the BSE Limited.

Services
GTL Ltd offers services like:

Network Planning
Services include Radio Frequency (RF) and Transmission Engineering, Fixed and Core Network Engineering for GSM, CDMA, Microwave Transmission, SDH, DWDM, WiMAX and Broadband networks.

Network Rollout
The company supports Wireline & Wireless domain including GSM, CDMA, Microwave Transmission, Optical Transmission, WiMAX and Broadband Networks.

Managed Services
GTL Ltd’s offerings are based on the Build-Operate-Manage (BOM) model. This offers KPI/SLA based end-to-end services from Network Planning & Design, System Engineering, Installation and commissioning, System Integration, Optimization, Network Operations and Field Maintenance.

Site Acquisition services
The GTL Site Acquisition Team deals with the technical, engineering and business aspects of site acquisition services.

Operation and Maintenance
GTL Ltd manages Network Operations and Maintenance activities for telecom operators by offering high performance network at reduced Operational Expenses (OPEX).

References

See also 
Mr. Manoj G. Tirodkar, Chairman & Managing Director (Founder Global Telesystems Limited)

Companies based in Mumbai
Indian companies established in 1987
1987 establishments in Maharashtra
Economy of Navi Mumbai
Telecommunications companies established in 1987
Companies listed on the Bombay Stock Exchange